Colurodontis paxmani is a species of filefish endemic to Australia.  This species grows to a length of  SL.  This species is the only known member of its genus.

External links 
 Paxman's Leatherjacket, Colurodontis paxmani Hutchins 1977

References

Monacanthidae
Marine fish of Western Australia
Fish described in 1977